Harry Potter and the Deathly Hallows – Part 2 is a 2011 action-adventure video game. It is based on the 2011 film of the same name. It was released on July 11, 2011 for mobiles devices, and on July 12 in North America and July 15 in Europe for Microsoft Windows, Nintendo DS, PlayStation 3, Wii, and Xbox 360.

The game continues to follow Harry Potter, Ron Weasley and Hermione Granger on their quest to defeat Lord Voldemort by destroying his remaining Horcruxes, items which contain part of his soul. Critics reviewed the game negatively for its gameplay, but claimed the game was an improvement over its previous instalment.

Gameplay

The gameplay of Deathly Hallows – Part 2 differs from Part 1, in order to address complaints made with the previous game. The game progresses linearly, through cutscenes, but does not include side missions like the previous game. Combat in Deathly Hallows – Part 2 involves button presses which initiates spell-casting as an attack. Three face buttons, usually with a symbol or a letter, on the controller have two spells each, and by pressing a button twice the player can access the button's second spell. For the Windows version, the player presses one of the six buttons to select a spell. A new feature is the ability to "Apparate", which allows the player to teleport in and out of battles, as a form of defence. Only Harry has this ability though. The player is able to control several characters from a third person over-the-shoulder camera including Harry Potter, Ron Weasley, Hermione Granger, Neville Longbottom, Minerva McGonagall, Seamus Finnigan, Ginny Weasley and Molly Weasley.
In the final battle, the player uses the directional buttons to move the beam and focus it on Voldemort.

Development
Part 2 of the video game was released to coincide with the release of the second part of Harry Potter and the Deathly Hallows. EA released a teaser in their Facebook page on April 21 and released the Part 2 video game site on the same day.

Release
On 8 May 2011, EA revealed the game covers for all the major platforms. The cover depicts the trio, surrounded by fellow Hogwarts students, and Death Eaters, and a destroyed Hogwarts in flames in the background.

Part 2 is the first Harry Potter video game to feature PlayStation Move functionality. On 26 May 2011, six new images from the game surfaced online along with a new interview with IGN. The images included, duels between the core characters, and the Hogwarts castle itself, under severe stress. On 21 April 2011, Emma Watson released the first trailer. On 1 June 2011, Rupert Grint released a new trailer, showing all the playable characters. Later, a second new trailer was presented showing the tagline "War is Coming" and "The Battle for Hogwarts". On July, before the film release, the launch trailer was released.

Reception

Harry Potter and the Deathly Hallows – Part 2 received mixed to negative reviews from critics, though some critics found Part 2 an improvement of Part 1. Lowest ratings on Metacritic came from GamesRadar, stating, "This is the absolute nadir of the series. Harry Potter has finally devolved into a total cash-in and we can't score it low enough." GamingXP gave the Xbox 360 and PC versions positive reviews, saying "Where graphical aesthetics, thrilling atmosphere and a cinematic soundtrack celebrate their marriage, the gamer always wins."

The Escapist gave it two-and-a-half stars out of five and said of the game, "The shooting mechanics and levels are getting better but the encounters themselves are too repetitive. I hope someone takes the basic idea and does something more with it. The absence of basic storytelling and scene transitions make it hard to enjoy on its own." Digital Spy gave it two stars out of five and said, "The gameplay remains a weak imitation of a third-person shooter and the enemy A.I. is extremely poor. The lack of variety in the set pieces and the sheer number of dopey Death Eaters makes Harry Potter and the Deathly Hallows: Part 2 a tedious experience, riddled with repetition." The Daily Telegraph also gave it a score of four out of ten and called it "a bland, unimaginative shooting gallery that lacks the thing that matters most: magic."

References

External links
 
 
 

2011 video games
Action-adventure games
Electronic Arts games
Full Fat games
Gameloft games
Warner Bros. video games
Harry Potter video games
Video games based on adaptations
Nintendo DS games
PlayStation 3 games
PlayStation Move-compatible games
Video game sequels
Video games developed in the United Kingdom
Wii games
Windows games
Xbox 360 games
Video games scored by Allister Brimble
Video games scored by James Hannigan
Video games set in England
Video games set in Scotland
Video games set in the 1990s
Video games set in 1998
Video games set in castles